Lithoxus lithoides is a species of armored catfish native to Guyana and Suriname where it is found in stony rivulets of the Essequibo and upper Correntyne River basins.  It can be found clinging to rocks in rapidly moving water.  This species grows to a length of  SL.

References
 

Ancistrini
Fish described in 1912
Fish of Guyana
Fish of Suriname